Yakov Petrovich Kulnev (6 August 1763 – 1 August 1812) was, along with Pyotr Bagration and Aleksey Yermolov, one of the most popular Russian military leaders at the time of the Napoleonic Wars. Suvorov's admirer and participant of 55 battles, he lost his life during Napoleon's invasion of Russia.

Early campaigns 
Kulnev's father was a Russian Cavalry officer of lesser noble background who served in the Kargopol Regiment of Dragoons. The future general was born in Ludza (present-day Latvia), of which his father was afterwards a Mayor, and matriculated at the Infantry School for Nobility in 1785.

He joined a hussar regiment and, under Suvorov's command, took part in the Russo-Turkish War, 1787-1792 and the Polish Campaign of 1794-1795. The following decade of his life is obscure.

In 1807 Kulnev was put in charge of the regiment of Hrodna hussars fighting against Napoleon. He made a name for himself at Heilsberg and Friedland, in which he famously fought his way out of an encirclement.

Finnish campaign 
In the Finnish War against Sweden, Kulnev led Buxhoevden's vanguard. For his part in the storm of Jakobstad he was awarded a golden sabre. He encouraged guerrilla fighting and fought with distinction at Lapua, Kuortane, Oravais — three engagements which earned him Order of Saint George and the rank of Major General. Denis Davydov, who fought under his command in Finland, described Kulnev's exploits in his memoirs.

Kulnev crowned the campaign by leading Bagration's vanguard across the frozen Baltic Sea towards the Åland Islands and thence to Grisslehamn, within 70 km from the Swedish capital, Stockholm. This daring manoeuvre forced the Swedes to seek peace at any cost.

Turkish campaign 
Awarded for his courage with Order of Saint Anna of the 1st Degree, Kulnev was invited to take charge of the vanguard of the Danube Army which fought against the Turks in Bulgaria.

During the Turkish Campaign of 1810, Kulnev was one of Russia's ablest generals. His bold leadership made itself felt at Shumla, Nikopol, Rousse, and Batin, giving the campaign a character of decision it had been lacking heretofore. 

A conflict with the commander-in-chief, Nikolay Kamensky, forced him to leave the army, however.

War of 1812 
After Napoleon invaded Russia in 1812, Kulnev was entrusted with defending the roads leading to the capital, Saint Petersburg. On July 3, his detachment took prisoner a French general and 200 cavalrymen.

On 18 July, he led 5,000 cavalrymen — who formed a vanguard of Wittgenstein's corps — against Marshal Oudinot in the Battle of Klyastitsy. Taking prisoner 900 enemy soldiers, Kulnev crossed the Drissa River and clashed with a major French contingent. As the Russians came under heavy artillery fire, Kulnev was struck in the legs by a cannonball and lost both limbs. He died from the effects of wounds received at this engagement.

Assessment 
Although he did not live to take part in the Battle of Borodino and other famous battles of the Patriotic War, Kulnev was long remembered as a tough, impetuous, hot-tempered fighter. In 1830, the spot of his death was marked by a monument, with Zhukovsky's epitaph inscribed on it. In 1909, a hussar regiment was given his name. He died five days before his 49th birthday.

A typical Romantic hero of the Napoleonic Wars, he emancipated his serfs and was reputed to live in poverty, in order to emulate the soldiers of Roman antiquity that were his ideal. It has been suggested that Dubrovsky, a protagonist of Pushkin's eponymous novel, was modeled on Kulnev: Dubrovsky is described in the text as "a dark, swarthy 35-year-old, with a moustache and a beard, a genuine portrait of Kulnev". The Russian general is also the subject of Runeberg's poem Kulneff (1848), which is part of The Tales of Ensign Stål:

The Russian host could vaunt the name
Of many a seasoned veteran
Recorded on the scroll of fame
Before our war began.
Barclay, Kamensky, Bagration,
Were household names to every son 
of Finland. When they hove in sight,
We could expect a fight.

But Kulnev's name was new to all
Before the flame of war was blown
And he came rushing like a squall,
Scarce dreamed of before known.
He struck like lightning from the blue
So terrible and yet so new,
But ne'er to be forgot, we felt,
From the first blow he dealt.

English translation by Charles Wharton Stork

Further reading 

Жизнь, характер и военные деяния храброго генерал-майора Якова Петровича Кульнева в Польше, Германии, Швеции, Турции и в достопамятную Отечественную войну 1812 года в России. Писанная А.Н.Н-м. [Life, Character and Military Actions of Valiant Major General Yakov Petrovich Kulnev in Poland, Germany, Sweden, Turkey and in the Memorable Patriotic War of 1812 in Russia]. Parts 1-2. SPb, 1815.
Дух генерала Кульнева или черты и анекдоты, изображающие великие свойства его и достопамятные происшествия, как из частной, так и из военной его жизни... [The Ethos of General Kulnev, or Traits and Anecdotes Representing His Great Qualities and Memorable Incidents from His Private and Military Life]. SPb, 1817.
Яков Петрович Кульнев. 1763-1812. Очерк его боевой жизни. Письма к брату. Могила Якова Петровича Кульнева. [Yakov Petrovich Kulnev (1763-1812): Outline of His Military Career. Letters to His Brother. The Tomb of Yakov Petrovich Kulnev]. Moscow, 1887.
Елец Ю.Л. Кульнев. (К столетию Отечественной войны). [Yelets Yu.L. Kulnev. To the Centenary of the Patriotic War]. SPb, 1912.

1763 births
1812 deaths
People from Ludza
Imperial Russian major generals
Hussars
Russian commanders of the Napoleonic Wars
Russian military personnel of the Finnish War
Russian people of the Kościuszko Uprising
Russian Imperial Hussars officers
French invasion of Russia
Recipients of the Order of St. George of the Third Degree
Military personnel of the Russian Empire killed in action
Military personnel killed in the Napoleonic Wars